Cantalojas is a municipality located in the province of Guadalajara, Castile-La Mancha, Spain. According to the 2004 census (INE), the municipality has a population of 144 inhabitants. The Church of San Pedro Apóstol was declared Bien de Interés Cultural in 1965.

References

Municipalities in the Province of Guadalajara